China Anne McClain (born August 25, 1998) is an American actress and singer. McClain's career began when she was seven years old, portraying Alexis in the film The Gospel (2005), and then China James in Daddy's Little Girls (2007). She then received recognition for starring as Jazmine Payne in the television series Tyler Perry's House of Payne (2007–2012; 2020–present) and as Charlotte McKenzie in the film Grown Ups (2010); and became internationally known for starring as Chyna Parks in the Disney Channel television series A.N.T. Farm (2011–2014), and as Uma in the Disney Channel films Descendants 2 (2017) and Descendants 3 (2019). In 2018, McClain began starring in The CW superhero series Black Lightning (2018–2021) as Jennifer Pierce / Lightning. She also reprised her character Jazmine Payne on OWN's revival of The Paynes (2018).

McClain began her musical career in 2005 as a member of the sister girl group the 3mcclaingirls with her sisters Sierra and Lauryn. Her first professional single was "Your Biggest Fan" with Nick Jonas on the soundtrack album Jonas L.A. (2010). In 2011, McClain signed with Hollywood Records both as a solo artist and with her sister girl group, known as the McClain Sisters. Her debut single as a solo artist was "Dynamite" which peaked at no. 2 on the US Kid Digital Songs, and her second single, "Calling All the Monsters", peaked at no. 1 on the same chart and earned 25,000 downloads within its first week of release. The A.N.T. Farm soundtrack album spent five weeks on the Billboard Kids chart in 2011 and sold 14,000 copies in its first week of release. Billboard also named her the sixth best-selling artist for digital kids' songs in 2012. In 2017, her single "What's My Name" from Descendants 2 peaked on several Billboard charts, and was certified gold, with 500,000 units sold, on November 10, 2017. In June 2020 her sister girl group changed their name to Thriii.

Early life
China Anne McClain was born on August 25, 1998 and raised in Decatur, Georgia. Her father, Michael McClain, is a music producer who produced a track on Solange Knowles' debut album Solo Star (2002). Her mother, Shontell, is a songwriter and former screenwriter. She has two older sisters, Sierra and Lauryn, who are also actresses and singers, and has a younger brother, Gabriel.

Career

2005–2010: Daddy's Little Girls and Tyler Perry's House of Payne
McClain was discovered in 2005 by a music executive who heard her singing and encouraged director Rob Hardy to audition her for his 2005 feature film The Gospel. McClain auditioned for the Disney Channel Original Movie Jump In! (2007) and won a role but turned it down to instead star in the television series Tyler Perry's House of Payne (2007–present) as Jazmine Payne, after catching Tyler Perry's attention. Disney kept working with McClain where she booked several guest roles in the years to come. She appeared in the movie Daddy's Little Girls (2007) with her sisters, Sierra and Lauryn, who are also actresses and played her older sisters in the film.

McClain appeared in various other shows and movies such as Hannah Montana (2009) with future co-star Sierra McCormick, NCIS (2009), and the film Hurricane Season (2009). In 2009, McClain booked the starring role as Janet in the Disney Channel pilot Jack and Janet Save the Planet alongside future co-stars McCormick and Jake Short. The pilot was not picked up and never aired. She also appeared in the film Grown Ups (2010) as Charlotte McKenzie, the daughter of Chris Rock's and Maya Rudolph's characters. McClain had a recurring role on Disney Channel show Jonas (2010) as Kiara, and sang alongside Nick Jonas for the song "Your Biggest Fan" which was featured both in the series and on Jonas L.A., the show's soundtrack album.

2011–2014: A.N.T. Farm and the McClain Sisters

In February 2011, McClain guest starred on Wizards of Waverly Place (2011). In May, McClain won the NAMIC Vision Award for Best Performance – Actress of Comedy, for her performance as Jazmine Payne. Later that year, McClain was cast as the lead role, Chyna Parks, in the Disney Channel series A.N.T. Farm, which Disney tailored for her. She sang and composed the series theme song "Exceptional". For the show, McClain recorded a cover of Taio Cruz's "Dynamite", for which the music video amassed more than 1 million views in under a week after release on YouTube. She appeared in an episode of PrankStars (2011). For the Disney Channel Halloween special in 2011, she performed the song "Calling All the Monsters". On June 14, 2011, McClain and her sisters – known as the McClain Sisters – signed with Hollywood Records.

The A.N.T. Farm soundtrack was released on October 11, 2011, which includes McClain's version of "Dynamite" and her original song "Calling All the Monsters", among other songs performed by her featured in the show and new songs performed by some of her fellow cast members and two songs performed by the McClain Sisters. The soundtrack for the show was successful, spending five weeks on the Billboard Kids chart in 2011, peaked at number 29 on the US Billboard 200, peaked at number 2 on the US Top Soundtracks, and sold 14,000 copies within the first week of release. On September 28, 2011, McClain released "Calling All the Monsters" to iTunes. "Calling All the Monsters" charted at number 86 on the Billboard Hot 100 chart, and received 25,000 downloads within its first week of release. That same month McClain earned a J-14 Teen Icon Award nomination for Icon of Tomorrow.On November 10, 2011, McClain met with the then First Lady Michelle Obama at the White House to speak about the Joining Forces initiative; the next day Disney Channel aired messages promoting the initiative, which recognizes America's military families and children, and brings awareness on Veterans Day. On November 19, 2011, McClain performed at the Magnificent Mile Lights Festival in Chicago. On November 24, 2011, she performed her song "Unstoppable" at the 85th Macy's Thanksgiving Day Parade (2011). In December, McClain and her sisters, Sierra and Lauryn, performed their version of the song "Jingle Bell Rock" at the 2011 Disney Parks Christmas Day Parade.

In February 2012, McClain performed her song "Unstoppable" and guest starred in the television series So Random!. Later that month she received an NAACP Image Award nomination for Outstanding Performance by a Youth for her performance as Chyna Parks in A.N.T. Farm. On March 4, 2012, McClain was the opening act alongside her sisters in Houston for Big Time Rush on their Better with U Tour. On March 11, 2012, the McClain Sisters performed their new song called "Rise", featured in the Disneynature film Chimpanzee, at the Mall of America. The song was released on March 23, 2012. The music video premiered on March 25, 2012 during an episode of Austin & Ally. It was also a featured song for Disney's Friends for Change.

McClain also sang the theme song for the first three seasons for the Disney Channel children's television series Doc McStuffins, which premiered on March 23, 2012, and guest starred later that year as Tisha McStuffins, the main character's cousin. On April 9, 2012, McClain performed at the 2012 White House Easter Egg Roll with her sisters. In September, McClain earned a nomination for another J-14 Teen Icon Award as an Iconic Triple Threat. In December it was announced that she was nominated for another NAACP Image Award for Outstanding Performance by a Youth for A.N.T. Farm. Billboard also named her the sixth best-selling artist for digital kids' songs in 2012.

McClain was one of the award presenters at the 2013 Radio Disney Music Awards in April. In July, she reprised her role as Charlotte McKenzie in the 2013 sequel Grown Ups 2. On December 27, 2013, it was announced on her Twitter page that A.N.T. Farm would be ending after its third season. The series finale aired on March 21, 2014. On the same day, it was revealed that the McClain Sisters had left Hollywood Records. The McClain Sisters changed their name to simply McClain, their last names.

In the March/April 2014 issue of BYOU magazine, McClain said it was "bittersweet" that A.N.T Farm was ending, and announced plans to focus on doing music with her sisters. For her performance in the series, in 2014, McClain won both the NAMIC Vision Award for Best Performance – Actress of Comedy, and the NAACP Image Award for Outstanding Performance by a Youth.

In April 2014, it was announced that McClain would compete as one of the celebrity contestants on ABC's Sing Your Face Off (2014). She competed from May to June of that year, performing as several iconic singers: Rihanna, Tina Turner, Michael Jackson, Alicia Keys, James Brown, and Whitney Houston; she won the show's first and only season. In August, McClain starred in the Disney Channel television film How to Build a Better Boy (2014) alongside Kelli Berglund, and released the single "Something Real" which was featured in the film. For her performance, McClain received an NAACP Image Award nomination for Outstanding Performance by a Youth. In August 2014, McClain hosted the 19th Arthur Ashe Kids' Day, and also performed with her sisters. In November 2014, McClain guest starred on R.L. Stine's The Haunted Hour in the episode "Argh V".

2015–present: Descendants and Black Lightning
In 2015, McClain was featured in the FOX series Bones (2015) in the episode "The Lost in the Found", playing Kathryn Walling. McClain sang "Night is Young" on the soundtrack for the Disney Channel Original Movie Descendants. Her song also appeared in Descendants: Wicked World (2015). She voiced Freddie, the daughter of Dr. Facilier. Her sister, Lauryn McClain, voiced the character for season two. McClain voiced the role of Ghufaira in the 3D computer-animated action-drama film Bilal: A New Breed of Hero (2015). She went on to guest star on The Night Shift, and starred in a voice role as Lyra in the English version of the film Sheep and Wolves, both in 2016. On November 25, 2016, McClain performed her cover of the song "This Christmas" at the Disney Parks Presents: A Descendants Magical Holiday Celebration.

In April 2017, she was an award presenter at the 2017 Radio Disney Music Awards. In June, Variety named her one of the "10 TV Stars to Watch in 2017" for her role as Jennifer Pierce in her then upcoming 2018 television series Black Lightning. In July, Descendants 2 premiered, in which she played the villain Uma, the daughter of Ursula. Her single "What's My Name" from the film peaked on several Billboard charts and was certified gold, with 500,000 units sold, on November 10, 2017. She also guest starred as Sheena on K.C. Undercover (2017), and starred as Meg in the Lifetime television film Ten: Murder Island (2017), which she also executive produced.

In January 2018, McClain began playing Jennifer Pierce in Black Lightning on The CW, and in February reprised her role as Jazmine Payne on The Paynes (2018). Later that year in September, she reprised her role as Uma in the television short film Under the Sea: A Descendants Short Story. In November, she starred in the action thriller film Blood Brother, opposite Trey Songz and Ron Killings. In November 2018, McClain performed her original song "Young Guns" during a season two episode of Black Lightning.

In August 2019, McClain reprised her role as Uma in Descendants 3. In February 2020 it was announced that Tyler Perry's House of Payne would be revived on BET. In June 2020, her girl group changed their name to Thriii, and performed at Radio Disney Presents ARDYs Summer Playlist. On August 20, it was announced that Tyler Perry's House of Payne would premiere on September 2, 2020. Later that year, McClain was part of the cast of the Netflix comedy Hubie Halloween.

In March 2021, McClain left Black Lightning and her role was recast with Laura Kariuki. McClain, however, later returned to reprise her role in the series finale.

Personal life 
In 2014, Lauryn and China created a YouTube channel where they posted singing videos, challenges, tags, and Q&As. Sierra appeared in several of the channel's videos. As of August 2020, the channel has approximately 701,000 subscribers and 29 million views. They have since renamed the channel Thriii.

As of 2011, she resided in Los Angeles. McClain cites her parents as her biggest influences.

Filmography

Film

Television

Discography

Awards and nominations

References

External links

 
 
 
 
 

1998 births
Living people
21st-century American actresses
African-American women singers
American child singers
Child pop musicians
Hollywood Records artists
African-American Christians
Musicians from Atlanta
Walt Disney Records artists
African-American actresses
American film actresses
American child actresses
African-American child actresses
21st-century American women singers
American television actresses
Actresses from Georgia (U.S. state)
Actresses from Atlanta
American pop musicians
American women pop singers
American YouTubers
Music YouTubers
American TikTokers
21st-century American singers